Chang'adai (21 November 1643 - 29 May 1665), formally the Prince Xunhuaimin of the First Rank (巽懷愍親王), was an imperial prince of the Qing dynasty of China. He was the son of Mandahai and his primary consort, Lady Khorchin Borijit.

Life 
Chang'adai was born in the last year of Huang Taiji's reign as Mandahai's seventh son. He had a full brother named Huse.

In the 9th year of the Shunzhi Emperor's reign (1652), his father passed away and he inherited the title of "Prince Xun". However, in the 16th year of Shunzhi's reign (1659), it was found that his father had confiscated a part of former Prince Regent Dorgon's property, which lead to Chang'adai's demotion.

He died in the 4th year of the Kangxi Emperor's reign (1665), and the court gave him the posthumous title of Prince Xunhuaimin of the First Rank. His princedom was inherited by his sixth son, Xingni.

Family 

Parents:

 Father: Mandahai, Prince Xunjian of the First Rank (巽簡親王 滿達海; 30 April 1622 – 15 March 1652)
 Mother: Primary consort Khorchin Borjigit (嫡福晉 博爾濟吉特氏)

Wives

 Primary Consort, of the Naiman Borijit (嫡夫人奈曼博爾濟吉特氏)
 Secondary Consort, of the Nara clan (側福晉納喇氏)
 Xingni (奉恩輔國公 星尼), Bulwark Duke by Grace, sixth son
 Secondary Consort, of the Zhou clan (側夫人周氏)
 Xilengtu (奉恩將軍 錫楞圖), General of the Fourth Rank, second son
 Mistress, of the Shi clan (庶福晋石氏)
 Shixian (奉恩將軍 世憲), General of the Fourth Rank, third son
 Xichang (奉恩將軍 希常), General of the Fourth Rank, fifth son
 Mistress, of the Han clan (庶夫人韓氏)
 Suojing (索晉), first son
 Guangchang (廣昌), General of the Fourth Rank, fourth son
 Mistress, of the Tang clan (妾唐氏)

See also 

 Royal and noble ranks of the Qing dynasty
 Ranks of imperial consorts in China#Qing

References 

 
 
 

Qing dynasty imperial princes
1622 births
1652 deaths